The 2020 Summer Olympics women's park skateboarding competition occurred on 4 August 2021 at Ariake Urban Sports Park in Tokyo, Japan.

It was originally scheduled to be held in 2020, but on 24 March 2020, the Olympics were postponed to 2021 due to the COVID-19 pandemic. 

Sakura Yosozumi and Kokona Hiraki of Japan won the gold and silver medals, with Sky Brown of Great Britain winning the bronze medal.

Qualification

Competition format 
In the prelims, the twenty participating skateboarders were sorted into four heats of five skaters each. Each each skater did three 45-second runs in their designated heat. The best run score of each skater's three runs built a ranking. The eight top-ranked skaters from the combined ranking of the heats qualified for the final.

Results

Semifinals 
The top 8 skateboarders of 20 advanced to the finals.

Final

See also
Skateboarding at the 2020 Summer Olympics – Men's park
Skateboarding at the 2020 Summer Olympics – Women's street
Cycling at the 2020 Summer Olympics – Women's BMX freestyle

References

Skateboarding at the 2020 Summer Olympics
Women's events at the 2020 Summer Olympics